Jamie King (born 1972) is an American creative director, choreographer, and producer. His work directing concert tours for pop stars has grossed over $2 billion.

Early career
King started his career in entertainment as a dancer. He appeared on the Cher video for "Love And Understanding" and went on tour with Michael Jackson on his Dangerous World Tour in 1992. Afterwards he worked as a director and choreographer in Prince's Glam Slam West nightclub in Los Angeles. While there, King created a new show every week using songs that Prince was unable to commercially release due to legal obligations to Warner Bros. Records. It was during this time that King learned staging. After seeing a performance by Prince at the American Music Awards of 1995 (that King directed and choreographed), Madonna called King to talk about the two of them working together. The first time they worked together was when he choreographed her 1995 music video "Human Nature".

Fitness ventures
In 2004, King teamed up with Nike to create the Nike Rockstar Workout for use in Crunch Fitness gyms across the United States. In 2007, he released his Rock Your Body fitness DVD which sold 100,000 copies.

Cirque du Soleil, Super Bowl, and Q'Viva
In 2011 King wrote and directed a touring show by Cirque du Soleil dedicated to Michael Jackson called Michael Jackson: The Immortal World Tour. In 2012, he co-created the boy band IM5 with Perez Hilton and Simon Fuller and directed Madonna's Super Bowl XLVI halftime performance. This performance marked the third time he appeared at Super Bowl for work. His first appearance was in 1993 as a dancer in Michael Jackson's performance at Super Bowl XXVII. He returned in 1996 as a choreographer for Diana Ross' performance at Super Bowl XXX.

Also in 2012, he produced the Latin-themed entertainment show Q'Viva! The Chosen with Simon Fuller, Marc Anthony, and Jennifer Lopez. The show was King's first experience working in television rather than stage; however, the singers, instrumentalists, and dancers scouted from the show did give a one-time sold-out performance at the Mandalay Bay Events Center which King also directed. King was the producer for Madonna's 2012 MDNA Tour which marked the first time since Madonna's 2001 Drowned World Tour that he had not been her tour's creative director.

In 2013, King directed another Cirque Du Soleil Michael Jackson-themed show called Michael Jackson: One. Unlike the touring show Immortal, Michael Jackson: One is a resident stage show housed at the Mandalay Bay Resort and Casino. Later in the year, King was the creative director for the third season of The X Factor.

In 2014, King directed Bruno Mars' Super Bowl XLVIII halftime performance which marked the fourth time he had appeared at Super Bowl for work.

Tours
King was the director for the following tours/productions:
 1996: Take Me Higher: A Celebration of 30 years of the Super Bowl halftime show - Diana Ross
 1999-2000: Livin' la Vida Loca Tour – Ricky Martin
 2000-2001: Oops!... I Did It Again World Tour – Britney Spears
 2001: Drowned World Tour – Madonna
 2003: Stripped World Tour – Christina Aguilera
 2004: Re-Invention World Tour – Madonna
 2006: Confessions Tour – Madonna
 2006-2007: Rain's Coming World Tour – Rain
 2006-2007: Back to Basics Tour – Christina Aguilera
 2007: Ricky Martin Live: Black and White Tour – Ricky Martin
 2007-2008: The Return of the Spice Girls – Spice Girls
 2008: The Best Damn Tour – Avril Lavigne
 2008-2009: Taking Chances World Tour – Celine Dion
 2008: Hard Candy Promo Tour – Madonna
 2008-2009: Sticky & Sweet Tour – Madonna
 2009: The Circus Starring Britney Spears – Britney Spears
 2010: Last Girl on Earth Tour – Rihanna
 2011: Loud Tour – Rihanna
 2011: Femme Fatale Tour – Britney Spears
 2011: Michael Jackson: The Immortal World Tour – Cirque du Soleil
 2012: ¡Q'Viva! The Chosen Live – Reality Show: Los Angeles, Las Vegas & Tour of Latin America 
 2012: Super Bowl XLVI halftime show – Madonna
 2012: Dance Again World Tour - Jennifer Lopez
 2012: Summer Tour 2012 - Jennifer Lopez and Enrique Iglesias
 2013: Michael Jackson: One – Cirque du Soleil
 2014: Super Bowl XLVIII Halftime Show – Bruno Mars
 2014-2015: Japan Dome Tour "X" – Big Bang
 2015-2016: Rebel Heart Tour - Madonna
 2018: Liberation Tour - Christina Aguilera
 2019: The Nicki Wrld Tour - Nicki Minaj
 2019-2020: Madame X Tour - Madonna (credited as a creative producer)

Sources:

References

External links

1972 births
Living people
American choreographers
People from Verona, Wisconsin
Writers from Wisconsin
American male dancers
American theatre directors
Cirque du Soleil
American male writers